Ozolnieki Municipality is a former municipality in Semigallia, Latvia. The municipality was formed in 2003 by merging Ozolnieki Parish and Cena Parish; the administrative centre being Ozolnieki. In 2009 municipality absorbed Sidrabene parish (in 2011 renamed to Salgale parish), too. The population in 2020 was 10,019.

On 1 July 2021, Ozolnieki Municipality ceased to exist and its territory was merged into Jelgava Municipality.

Geography 
The municipality is located in the north of Zemgale Plain. It shares borders with Olaine municipality, Ķekava municipality, Bauska municipality, Iecava municipality, Jelgava municipality and the city Jelgava. The centre of Ozolnieki municipality - the town Ozolnieki - is located 6 kilometers from the city Jelgava and 36 kilometers from the (political) Riga. Total area - 286.1 km2.

Villages 
Ozolnieki, Iecēni, Brankas, Glūdas, Raubēni, Āne, Tetele, Cenas, Dalbe, Emburga, Garoza, Jaunpēternieki and Renceles.

Rivers 
The biggest rivers in territory of municipality are Lielupe, Iecava and Misa. From the smaller rivers, streams and canals the most important are: Cena, Garoze, Mazais Ragvēzis, Mizupīte, Renģele, Sidrabenīte, Sodzeris, Podzīte, Velnagrāvis and Zaķstrauts.

Lakes/ Ponds 
There are few artificial lakes in ex-claypits - Ozolnieku ezers near Ozolnieki village, Džammu dīķis, Lieģu dīķis near Brankas village, Senču dīķis, Ānes dīķis and Jāņa dīķis near Āne village, Viesturu dīķis near Tetele village, Libertu dīķis in Raubēni village and Akmenscūciņu karjers near Emburga village.

Swamps 
Few small swamps are located in the territory of municipality: Briežu purvs, Būdukalna tīrelis, Čauku purvs, Danču purvs, Ķempu purvs, Lāču purvs, Pēternieku purvs, Sērenu purvs and Vīlantu purvs.

History 
The origin of the name Ozolnieki most likely comes from Ozolmuiža (in German: Eckhofen or Paulsgnade), the manor house which was located within the territory of the modern Ozolnieki municipality. In the age of the Duchy of Courland and Semigallia (1562–1791), Ozolmuiža belonged to its dukes. Amongst its owners was the most renowned of the duchy's DukesJacob Kettler, who kept an aviary of hunting gyrfalcons on the manor farm (Jacob's son, Frederick Casimir Kettler, later expanded the aviary). After the Courland was annexed by the Russian empire, Ozolmuiža manor passed to the tsars of Russia. Tsar Paul I allotted it to the governor of Courland, Karl Wilhelm Driesen. Subsequent manor owners included a number of different families, the last of which were the von der Reckes (until the formation of the Republic of Latvia)

During the Latvian War of Independence (1919–1920), Ozolnieki municipality was the scene of several battles against the Bermontians. In 1937, a monument was unveiled in memory of the Latvian soldiers killed in action there.

After the founding of the Republic of Latvia (1918–1920), and passage of the act regarding the Reform of agricultural lands, all manors were divided and distributed to Latvian farmers. All manor houses itself had been destroyed in the fighting of World War I and War of Independence. Their building materials, mainly stones and bricks, were used to build new farmsteads. In 1936 there were 401 new farms, down from a peak of 481. Local industry included brick-making, textiles, clay mining, leather tanning, a sawmill, and other light industry.

Throughout the two decades of Latvian independence, there was an active social and culture lifetwo elementary schools, a choir, a dance collective, an amateur theatre, a local unit of the Aizsargi Home Guard, and others societies.

The Soviet occupations (first in 1940 and second 1944-1991) did not spare Ozolnieki. In the mass deportations of 1949, the 42,000 Latvians deported on March 25, 1949 to Siberia included 18 inhabitants of the municipality. After those deportations, the USSR began to liquidate individual farms, forcing the formation of collective farms or kolkhozes. The kolhozes were given Soviet-inspired names such as “Sirpis un āmurs” (Sickle and Hammer), “Staļina ērglis″ (Stalin's eagle) and “Mičurina kolhozs” (Michurin's kolkhoz)whose name includes a play on the diminutive of a Latvian word regarding bodily functions.

Several administrative reforms took place in Ozolnieki municipality after World War II: in 1945, the Soviets divided the municipality into three villagesOzolnieki, Cena and Dalbe; in 1954 Ozolnieki village was liquidated and incorporated into Valgunde village, while Cena village was expanded, incorporating Tetele and Āne. Ozolnieki village was later incorporated in Cena village, but in 1979 was re-established as an urban village with autonomous administration (Latvian: pilsētciemats). After Latvia restored independence (1991), Ozolnieki and Cena retained their territories and were formed into parishes: Ozolnieki parish (Latvian: Ozolnieku pagasts) and Cena parish (Latvian: Cenu pagasts). In 2003 both parishes merged again into Ozolnieki municipality (Latvian: Ozolnieku novads) with its governmental centre in Ozolnieki. In 2009, in conjunction with the completion of the Administrative territorial reforms of Latvia, Ozolnieki municipality absorbed Sidrabene parish (since 2011 - Salgale parish).

Inhabitants 
In July 2020 the population of the municipality was 10,726 where 72% was Latvians, 17% Russians, 3% Belarusians, 2% Lithuanians, 2% Ukrainians, 1% Poles and 3% others.

Education, culture and sport 
There are three kindergartens, secondary school, elementary school, music school, the affiliates of the Baltic International Academy and The Higher School of Psychology located in the municipality. The Latvian Rural Advisory and Training Centre is located in Ozolnieki.

There are four libraries and two culture centres in the municipality.

In the centre of the former municipality. Ozolnieki, are located sports centre, ice hall and cable system for wakeboarding on Ozolnieki Lake. There are two volleyball teams (one plays in amateur league, other - VK Ozolnieki/Poliurs - in the Baltic Schenker league), motorcycle cluba and a tug of war club. The ice hockey team HK Ozolnieki/Monarhs was also based in Ozolnieki.

Notable sites 
 Fortifications (redoubts) built by Napoleon's army during invasion in Russia empire (1812):
 Silgrauži (Mazsilgrauži or Franči, too) redoubt - the best preserved redoubt in Latvia. Located at the right bank of Iecava river, where it meets Misa river. Redoubt has four corners (12x12 m) for cannons, earthen rampart (10–13 m wide) and moat filled with water around it. Total area - almost 200 000 m2.
 Blukas krogs (or Bluķi) redoubt - located at the right bank of Iecava river, in strategical place - near the ferry of the old Riga-Jelgava road. Total area - approximately 8 000 m2.
 Namiķi redoubt - located at the meeting of Iecava river and Garoze river.
 Dalbe Lutheran church (built in 1869).
 Tetele (or Tetelminde) tower (built in 1895) - located at the Lielupe river in the park of ex-Tetelminde manor house.
 Auči manor house - built in 1926 as a residence of family of the first president of Latvia Jānis Čakste.
 Stalgale Lutheran church (built in 2001).
 "Billītes" - Memorial house of the famous Latvian writer Edvarts Virza.

Famous people 
 Jānis Čakste (1859–1927) - the first President of Latvia (1922–1927)
 Edvarts Virza (1883–1940) - famous Latvian writer, poet, prosaist and publicist
 Fricis Apšenieks (1894–1941) - famous Latvian chess master
 Agris Neija (born in 1973) - Latvian motorsportist

Gallery

References 

 
Former municipalities of Latvia